Charles Earl Fuller (January 22, 1939 —  July 30, 2001) was an American football running back who played in the American Football League (AFL). He played college football at San Francisco State.

Early life and high school
Fuller was born in Vicksburg, Mississippi but grew up in Vallejo, California and attended Vallejo High School. He initially was the backup to future Pro Bowl running back Dick Bass.

College career
Fuller began his collegiate career at Vallejo Junior College before transferring to San Francisco State. As a senior, Fuller rushed for 463 yards and caught 12 passes for 225 yards and was named Little All-America by the Associated Press. He set a school record with 190 rushing yards.

Professional career
Fuller was selected by the San Francisco 49ers in the 16th round of the 1961 NFL Draft and by the Oakland Raiders in the 19th round of the 1961 AFL Draft. He signed with the 49ers but was cut during training camp and was signed by the Raiders after being released. Fuller was waived by the Raiders on October 2, 1962. In 1967, Fuller played for the San Jose Apaches of the Continental Football League.

References

External links
San Francisco State Gators profile

1939 births
2001 deaths
San Francisco State Gators football players
Players of American football from California
Oakland Raiders players
American football running backs
Sportspeople from Vallejo, California
San Francisco 49ers players
Continental Football League players